Oakland Center may refer to
 Oakland Air Route Traffic Control Center, referred to on the radio as "Oakland Center."
 Oakland City Center
 12th Street Oakland City Center station, a BART station.